Holata Micco (alternate spellings: Halpatter-Micco, Halbutta Micco, and Halpuda Mikko, meaning Alligator Chief; known by whites as Chief Billy Bowlegs or Billy Bolek) (c. 1810 – 1859) was an important leader of the Seminoles in Florida during the Second Seminole War and was the remaining Seminole's most prominent chief during the Third Seminole War, when he led the Seminoles' last major resistance against the United States government. With the possibilities of military victory dwindling and facing starvation, he finally agreed to relocate with his people to Indian Territory (present-day Oklahoma) in 1858. He is buried in Hughes County, Oklahoma.

Early life and Seminole Wars

Bowlegs was born into a family of hereditary chiefs descended from Cowkeeper of the Oconee tribe of the Seminole in the village of Cuscowilla on the Alachua savannah (present-day Payne's Prairie, near Micanopy, Florida).  His father's name was Secoffee, while it is thought that the chief Micanopy was his uncle. The surname "Bowlegs" may be an alternate spelling of Bolek, a preceding Seminole chief.  (A story that he had bowlegs from riding horses is unsubstantiated.)

Although Bowlegs signed the Treaty of Payne's Landing of 1832, he refused to leave Florida. He wasn't well-noted at the beginning of the Second Seminole War (roughly, 1835 to 1842).  After the capture (under a flag of truce offered by Gen. Thomas Jesup) and subsequent death of Osceola and the death of Micanopy, amidst the loss of other prominent Seminole chiefs, Bowlegs and his band of 200 warriors became some of the most prominent fighters surviving at the time hostilities ended on 14 August 1842.  To impress and awe the Seminole chiefs, the US government brought Bowlegs to Washington, D.C. to underline the power of the United States.

Bowlegs and his band lived in relative peace until 1855.  A group of army engineers and surveyors invaded his territory in southwestern Florida, where they cut down banana trees and destroyed other property in the course of building forts.  Some historians have viewed these actions as intentional provocation to make Bowlegs react, so the settlers would have a reason to force the Seminole out.  If so, the provocation worked: Bowlegs led his warriors in sporadic attacks against settlers for the next few years, in what is known as the Third Seminole War.  The Army was unable to subdue his guerrilla warfare.

Relocation

In early 1858, Chief Wild Cat of the Western Seminole was brought back from Indian Territory to convince Bowlegs to relocate voluntarily.  The US government offered Bowlegs $10,000 and each of his chiefs $1000 if they did so. Warriors and non-warriors were offered less.  They initially refused but later that year, the band of 123 agreed to relocation.  Billy's Creek in Fort Myers, Florida is named after Bowlegs as this was the spot where he was forced to surrender in 1858.

In May, Bowlegs and his followers arrived in New Orleans, en route to Arkansas and their new home in the Indian Territory.  A journalist described the chief as having "two wives, one son, five daughters, and a hundred thousand dollars in hard cash." After reaching Indian Territory, Bowlegs became a leading chief there.  He and his daughters became prominent land holders.

Other "Billy Bowlegs"
Sonuk Mikko, aka Billy Bowlegs, gained fame as a captain in the Union Army during the American Civil War. Some historical sources erred in conflating Holato Micco and the later Sonuk Mikko, who both were called Billy Bowlegs.

References

External links

"Billy Bowlegs", infoplease.com
"Billy Bowlegs", Chronicles of Oklahoma, Vol. 33, 1955

1810 births
1859 deaths
People from Micanopy, Florida
19th-century Seminole people
Native American leaders
Native American people of the Indian Wars
Native Americans of the Seminole Wars
People of Indian Territory